Radical 176 or radical face meaning "face" is one of the 11 Kangxi radicals (214 radicals in total) composed of 9 strokes.

In the Kangxi Dictionary, there are 66 characters (out of 49,030) to be found under this radical.

 is also the 180th indexing component in the Table of Indexing Chinese Character Components predominantly adopted by Simplified Chinese dictionaries published in mainland China.

In Simplified Chinese,  is also used as the simplified form of / ("noodles" or "flour").

Evolution

Derived characters

References

Literature

External links

Unihan Database - U+9762

176
180